Chlorophanus is a genus of weevils in the subtribe Tanymecina, described by Schönherr (in Sahlberg) in 1823.

Species
The following are included in BioLib.cz:
 Chlorophanus caudatus Fåhraeus, 1840
 Chlorophanus dorsiger Faust, 1897
 Chlorophanus excisus (Fabricius, 1801)
 Chlorophanus flavescens (Fabricius, 1787)
 Chlorophanus gibbosus (Paykull, 1792)
 Chlorophanus kubanensis Reitter, 1915
 Chlorophanus micans Krynicki, 1832
 Chlorophanus pollinosus (Fabricius, 1792)
 Chlorophanus rugicollis Gyllenhal, 1834
 Chlorophanus sellatus (Fabricius, 1798)
 Chlorophanus sibiricus Gyllenhal, 1834
 Chlorophanus viridis (Linnaeus, 1758)
 Chlorophanus vittatus Schoenherr, 1832
 Chlorophanus voluptificus Gyllenhal, 1834

References

Entiminae